Ernest Henri Demanne (7 May 1870 – 22 March 1938) was a French comedian.

Theatre 

1891: Le monde ou l’on s’ennuie by Édouard Pailleron, Théâtre des Célestins
1891: le Duc de Ravinel by Louis Péricaud, Théâtre des Célestins
1891: L’Abbé Constantin adaptation by Pierre Decourcelle, Théâtre des Célestins
1891: Nos bons villageois by Victorien Sardou, Théâtre des Célestins
1891: Le petit Jacques by Jules Arsène Arnaud Claretie, Théâtre des Célestins
1892: la Joie fait peur by Émile de Girardin, Théâtre des Célestins
1892: le Prince d'Aurec by Henri Lavedan, au Théâtre des Arts de Bordeaux.
1893: Un mariage au chocolat by Paul Berthelot, au Théâtre des Arts de Bordeaux.
1894: Un fil à la patte by Georges Feydeau, au Grand Cercle d'Aix-les-Bains
1894: Le Système Ribadier by Georges Feydeau, au Grand Cercle d'Aix-les-Bains
1894: Le brigadier de Bombignac by Alexandre Bisson, au Casino Grand Cercle
1895: L'Ami des Femmes, by Alexandre Dumas, Théâtre royal du Parc à Bruxelles
1895: Faux bonshommes, by Etienne Carjat, Théâtre royal du Parc
1896: Numa Roumestan, by Alphonse Daudet, Théâtre royal du Parc
1896: Mademoiselle Eve, by  Gyp, Théâtre royal du Parc
1896: Marcelle, by. Victorien Sardou, Théâtre royal du Parc à Bruxelles
1896: L'Ami des Femmes, by Alexandre Dumas, Théâtre royal du Parc
1896: Froufrou, by Ludovic Halévy and Henri Meilhac, Théâtre royal du Parc
1896: Cabotins, by Édouard Pailleron, Théâtre royal du Parc à Bruxelles
1896: Les rois en exil, by Alphonse Daudet and Paul Delair, Théâtre royal du Parc à Bruxelles
1897: Monsieur Noir by Charles Dantin, Théâtre du Gymnase
1897: La jeunesse de Louis XIV by Alexandre Dumas, Théâtre du Gymnase
1898: Les Transatlantique by Abel Hermant, Théâtre du Gymnase
1898: Jalouse by Alexandre Bisson, Théâtre du Gymnase
1898: L'aînée by Jules Lemaître, Théâtre du Gymnase
1898: Pour l'honneurby Alexandre de Blaskovich, Théâtre du Gymnase
1898: L'Offense by Maurice Donnay, Théâtre du Vaudeville
1899: Le Lys rouge by Anatole France, Théâtre du Vaudeville
1899:  Madame de Lavalette by Émile Moreau, Théâtre du Vaudeville
1899: La bonne hôtesse by Ambroise Janvier (1852–1905) and Marcel Ballot, Théâtre du Vaudeville
1899: Belle maman by Victorien Sardou and Raymond Deslandes, Théâtre du Vaudeville
1899: Rose d'automne by Auguste Dorchain, Théâtre du Vaudeville
1900: La robe rouge by Eugène Brieux, Théâtre du Vaudeville
1900: Georgette Lemeunier by Gustave Guiches, Théâtre du Vaudeville
1900: Madame Sans-Gêne by Victorien Sardou and Émile Moreau, Théâtre du Vaudeville
1900: Le fils de l'étrangère, by Desmirail, Théâtre du Gymnase
1900: La poigne by Jean Julien, Théâtre du Gymnase
1900: Le monsieur de chez Maxim by Alfred Delilia, Cercle de l'Union artistique
1901: Cyrano de Bergerac by Edmond Rostand, tournée en Autriche-Hongrie, Roumanie et Allemagne
1902: Ma fée by Pierre Veber and Maurice Soulié, direction Charles Baret, théâtre Khédivial du Caire
1902: Main gauche by Pierre Veber, direction Charles Baret, théâtre Khédivial du Caire
1902: Le marquis de Villemer by George Sand, direction Charles Baret, théâtre Zizinia d'Alexandrie
1902: Dormez je le veux by Georges Feydeau, direction Charles Baret, théâtre Zizinia d'Alexandrie
1903: La dame de chez Maxim by Georges Feydeau, avec la tournée Vast, Nouveau théâtre de Lyon
1903: Éducation de prince by Maurice Donnay, Nouveau théâtre de Lyon
1904: La bâillonnée by Pierre Decourcelle,  Théâtre municipal des Célestins de Lyon
1904: La Caroline by Maurice Vaucaire and Félix Galipaux, Casino municipal de Nice
1904: Truc du Brélien by Paul Armont and Nicolas Nancey, Théâtre municipal des Célestins de Lyon
1904: Trois anabaptistes by Alexandre Bisson, Théâtre des Célestins
1904: Les cambrioleurs de Paris by Henri Kéroul, Théâtre des Célestins 
1905: Une affaire scandaleuse by Maurice Ordonneau, Théâtre des Célestins
1905: Un héros by Edmond Fleg, Théâtre des Célestins
1905: L'Enfant du miracle by Paul Gavault and Robert Charvay, Casino d'Uriage
1908: L'Usurier by Thomas Corneille, Théâtre Michel
1912: Papa by Robert de Flers and Gaston Arman de Caillavet, Théâtre municipal de Strasbourg
1912: L’Assaut by Henry Bernstein, Tournée Baret at the Théâtre du Casino municipal de Trouville
1913: L’Idée de Françoise by Paul Gavault, Tournée Baret in Alsace (Mulhouse, Sainte-Marie-aux-Mines, Strasbourg and Colmar)
1913: Les Maris de Léontine by Alfred Capus, Tournée Baret in Alsace (Mulhouse, Sainte-Marie-aux-Mines, Strasbourg and Colmar)
1913: L’Anglais tel qu'on le parle by Tristan Bernard, Tournée Baret in Alsace (Mulhouse, Sainte-Marie-aux-Mines, Strasbourg nd Colmar)
1913: La Gamine by Pierre Veber, Tournée Baret in Alsace (Mulhouse, Sainte-Marie-aux-Mines, Strasbourg and Colmar)
1913: Le Grillon du foyer by Ludovic de Francmesnil, Tournée Baret in Alsace (Mulhouse, Sainte-Marie-aux-Mines, Strasbourg and Colmar)
1913: Asile de nuit by Max Maurey, Tournée Baret in Alsace (Mulhouse, Sainte-Marie-aux-Mines, Strasbourg and Colmar)
1920: Primerose by Robert de Flers and Gaston Arman de Caillavet, Tournée Baret at the Théâtre du Gymnase de Liège
1920: Le retour by Robert de Flers et Francis de Croisset, Tournée Baret at the Théâtre du Gymnase de Liège
1920: Et moi j'te dis qu'elle t'a fait de l'œil, by Maurice Hennequin, Tournée Baret at the Théâtre du Gymnase de Liège
1921: Chouchou, by Pierre Veber and Henry de Gorsse, Tournée Baret at the Théâtre d'Annecy.
1923: la Danseuse éperdue, by René Fauchois, Tournée Baret at the Grand Casino de Berck-Plage.
1926: Romance, by Robert de Flers and Francis de Croisset, Tournée Baret at the Casino of Arcachon beach.
1927: Romance by Robert de Flers and Francis de Croisset, Tournée Baret at the Majestic in Lens.

External links 
 Genealogy of Ernest Henri Demanne on geneanet. Research by Dominique Barbier in the De Manne / Demanne family (2010)

19th-century French male actors
French male stage actors
20th-century French male actors
Actors from Strasbourg
1870 births
1938 deaths
Burials at Père Lachaise Cemetery